Betlingchhip, also known as Betalongchhip, Balinchhip and Thaidawr is the highest peak of the Jampui Hills. It is located in the state of Tripura.

Highest point in Tripura
At 930 m Thaidawr peak is the highest mountain peak in the state of Tripura. The peak has a good surrounding scenery.

See also
List of mountains in India
List of mountains by elevation

References

External links
Betalongchhip in India

Mountains of Tripura
North Tripura district
Highest points of Indian states and union territories